Roger McGuinn & Band was Roger McGuinn's third full-length solo album and was released in 1975. Recorded in Los Angeles, the album was McGuinn's third attempt to re-establish himself as a significant musical force without The Byrds. The titular band included Stephen A. Love (electric bass), Richard Bowden (second guitar), David Lovelace (keyboards) and Greg Attaway (drums). The album peaked at number 162 in the US.

Produced by John Boylan, Roger McGuinn & Band was different from McGuinn's previous solo albums in that he allowed the musicians he had assembled to contribute to the songwriting of the album in the name of esprit de corps. Additionally, whereas McGuinn's previous albums showcased his ongoing songwriting partnership with lyricist Jacques Levy, two of his four contributions ("Lover of the Bayou" and "Born to Rock and Roll") were re-recordings of previously released Byrds songs. Unfortunately, while the band brought a tight, energetic groove to the music on the album, their songwriting contributions were disparaged by the contemporary press. Referring to the album many years later, McGuinn himself admitted that "A band should be a benevolent dictatorship. Democracy is a great form of government, but it doesn't work in rock & roll."

After the release of the album, McGuinn and the band spent a year touring to promote the record as an opening act for such bands as The Eagles and The Doobie Brothers
(including performances at Madison Square Garden and Carnegie Hall) before McGuinn finally dissolved the group.

Roger McGuinn & Band has been reissued on CD a number of times; first by Columbia Records in the early 1990s, with bonus tracks in 2004 by Sundazed Records and coupled with McGuinn's fourth album, Cardiff Rose, by BGO Records in 2007.

Track listing
All tracks composed by Roger McGuinn; except where indicated

 "Somebody Loves You" (Stephen A. Love, Allen Kemp)
 "Knockin' on Heaven's Door" (Bob Dylan)
 "Bull Dog" (Richard Bowden)
 "Painted Lady" (Greg Attaway, David Lovelace)
 "Lover of the Bayou" (Jacques Levy, Roger McGuinn)
 "Lisa"
 "Circle Song" (David Lovelace)
 "So Long" (Richard Bowden)
 "Easy Does It"
 "Born to Rock and Roll"

Bonus tracks
2004 CD reissue
 "Wasn’t Born To Follow" (live) (Carole King, Gerry Goffin)
 "Chestnut Mare" (live) (Jacques Levy, McGuinn)

Personnel
Roger McGuinn – vocals, guitars
Stephen A. Love - bass
Richard Bowden - guitar
Greg Attaway - drums
David Lovelace - keyboards

References 

Roger McGuinn albums
1975 albums
Columbia Records albums
Albums produced by John Boylan (record producer)